Ormberget is the highest mountain in Notgården, Ludvika, Sweden. From there you can see the entire lake called Nottjärn. Where the original name Ormberget actually comes from is somewhat of a mystery, but the name is commonly used among the (around 300-400) residents in the area.

There are a few buildings at the top of the mountain, and the slope down, although too small and not steep enough for skiing, is still popular among the locals during the winter. Its central location and close proximity to the lake called Nottjärn makes it common for people passing it by, or crossing it to get to the other side faster than taking the road that lies close by.

Landforms of Dalarna County
Mountains of Sweden